The Canberra Raiders competed in the NSWRL from 1982 until 1994, the ARL from 1995 to 1996, the Super League in 1997, and the NRL from 1998 until the current day.

Seasons 
NOTE: P=Premiers, R=Runners-Ups, M=Minor Premierships, F=Finals Appearance, W=Wooden Spoon

References 

Canberra Raiders
Australian rugby league seasons